Wilczkowice may refer to:

Wilczkowice, Lower Silesian Voivodeship (south-west Poland)
Wilczkowice, Kraków County in Lesser Poland Voivodeship (south Poland)
Wilczkowice, Oświęcim County in Lesser Poland Voivodeship (south Poland)
Wilczkowice, Świętokrzyskie Voivodeship (south-central Poland)

See also
Wilczek (disambiguation)